Omaxe Limited is an Indian real estate developer based in New Delhi. The company was founded by Rohtas Goel in 1989.

Company history

Rohtas Goel, a first-generation entrepreneur and civil engineer, founded Omaxe to undertake construction and contracting business in 1987.  In 1989, it was incorporated as Omaxe Builders Private Ltd. and subsequently in 1999; it became a ‘Limited Company’. Omaxe made its inroads into the evolving real estate sector in 2001. It soon launched several group housing projects at Noida and subsequently also launched its first township, the NRI City at Greater Noida. The company came out with its initial public offering, which got oversubscribed by 80 times, in 2007.

Projects 
Omaxe has diversified asset classes of townships, residential, commercial – shopping mall & office space and hotels. In the residential segment, it offers developed plots, villas, penthouses, group housing and independent floors. The company is presently executing 39 real estate projects – 13 group housing, 16 townships and 10 commercial malls, hotels.

Awards and recognition

 Special Jury Award for Excellent Contribution to Real Estate in Tier 2 & 3 cities at the Property Awards 2015.
 First Construction Company of northern India to receive an ISO 9001:2000 Certification.
 Excellence Award as recognition in excellence in productivity, quality innovation and management From Institute of Economic studies.

References

External links 
 Omaxe Ltd. Website

Companies based in New Delhi
Real estate companies of India
1989 establishments in Delhi
Real estate companies established in 1989
Indian companies established in 1989
Companies listed on the National Stock Exchange of India
Companies listed on the Bombay Stock Exchange